Erugocentrus is an extinct genus of prehistoric bony fish that lived from the Turonian.

References

Beryciformes
Late Cretaceous fish
Prehistoric ray-finned fish genera